A by-election was held for the New South Wales Legislative Assembly electorate of Murray on 6 October 1973 because of the death of Joe Lawson. Lawson had represented the district since 1932, as a member of the Country Party until 1968 when he lost pre-selection. He ran as an independent, winning the seat at the 1968 and 1971 elections.

Dates

Candidates
This was the first election for all 3 candidates and each would again contest the electorate at the general election in November 1973 with similar results.
Mary Meillon was the eldest daughter of Joe Lawson.
Bruce Jeffery was secretary of the Rural Lands Protection Board in Jerilderie and would later be elected the member for Oxley.
 Douglas Drew did not stand again after 1973.

Result

				

Joe Lawson died.

See also
Electoral results for the district of Murray
List of New South Wales state by-elections

References

1973 elections in Australia
New South Wales state by-elections
1970s in New South Wales
February 1973 events in Australia